Malus orientalis, the eastern crabapple or Caucasus apple, is a species in the genus Malus found in Turkey (including East Thrace), the Transcaucasus, and Iran. With its relatively large yellow fruit, it has been consumed by people for millennia, with a string of halved, dried fruit being found in a royal tomb at Ur. Drying the fruit and then rehydrating by boiling cuts the tartness. M.orientalis contributed slightly to the gene pool of domesticated apples, a distant second to Malus sieversii.

References

orientalis
Crabapples
Flora of European Turkey
Flora of Turkey
Flora of the Caucasus
Flora of Iran
Plants described in 1932